Delton AG is a strategic management holding company (located in Bad Homburg, Germany). Delton currently holds corporate investments in the sectors of pharmaceuticals and logistics.

The sole shareholder of Delton AG is Stefan Quandt. He is the fourth generation of Quandt family entrepreneurs.

References

External links
 Official website

Companies based in Frankfurt
Investment companies of Germany